Dryopteris campyloptera, also known as the mountain wood fern, is a large American fern of higher elevations and latitudes.  It was formerly known as Dryopteris spinulosa var. americana. This species also has been mistakenly referred to as D. austriaca and D. dilatata.

A distinctive feature of this fern is that the bottom innermost pinnule on the basal pinnae spans approximately the first two top innermost pinnules on the same pinnae.

This fern is a tetraploid species of hybrid origin, the parents being Dryopteris intermedia and Dryopteris expansa.  Phenotypologically, the fern greatly resembles the second parent.

In West Virginia, this species may only be found above 3800 feet elevation, but is a part of the normal flora in northern New England.

References

campyloptera
Ferns of the Americas
Ferns of the United States
Flora of the Northeastern United States
Flora of the Appalachian Mountains
Flora of West Virginia
Plants described in 1930
Natural history of the Great Smoky Mountains